Floetic is the debut studio album by the English R&B duo Floetry, released by DreamWorks Records in the United States on 1 October 2002 and on Polydor Records in the United Kingdom on 25 November 2002.

Critical reception

The album received favourable reviews from CMJ, Rolling Stone, Yahoo! Music, and other company sites. Allmusic gave the album three out of five stars.

Commercial performance
Floetic debuted at number nineteen on the Billboard 200 and number four on the Top R&B/Hip-Hop Albums. On 14 July 2003, the album was certified gold by the Recording Industry Association of America with US sales of over 864,000 copies to date.

Track listing

Samples
"Floetic" contains an interpolation of "Born to Be Blue" as written by Mel Tormé and Robert Wells.

Charts

Weekly charts

Year-end charts

Certifications

References

2002 debut albums
Albums produced by Dre & Vidal
DreamWorks Records albums
Floetry albums
Polydor Records albums